Maxillicosta is a genus of marine ray-finned fishes, belonging to the subfamily Neosebastinae, the gurnard scorpionfishes, part of the family Scorpaenidae. They are native to the eastern Indian Ocean and the western Pacific Ocean.

Taxonomy
Maxillicosta was first described as a genus in 1935 by the Australian ichthyologist Gilbert Percy Whitley when he described M. scabriceps, with its type locality given as Kingscote on Kangaroo Island in South Australia, as a monotypic genus but he also explicitly designated M scabriceps as its type species. The name of the genus Maxillicosta was chosen by Whitley as the type species hade a scaleless maxilla crossed by five ridges, costa in contract to the scaled maxilla of Neosebastes.

Species
There are currently six recognized species in this genus:
 Maxillicosta lopholepis Eschmeyer & Poss, 1976 (Bigeye gurnard perch)
 Maxillicosta meridianus Motomura, Last & M. F. Gomon, 2006 (Southern gurnard perch)
 Maxillicosta raoulensis Eschmeyer & Poss, 1976 (Red little gurnard perch)
 Maxillicosta reticulata (F. de Buen, 1961)
 Maxillicosta scabriceps Whitley, 1935 (Little gurnard perch)
 Maxillicosta whitleyi Eschmeyer & Poss, 1976 (Whitley's gurnard perch)

Characteristics
Maxillicosta gurnard perches are small scorpaenid fishes that possess an expanded rear surface of the maxillary and the outer surface of the dentary has a number of clear, horizontal ridges. The maxillary, intraorbital and occipital areas of the head have no scales. They have 20-27 fin rays in the pectoral fins. Some of them do not have a swim bladder.

Distribution
Maxillicosta gurnard perches are found in the southwestern Pacific Ocean and southeastern Indian Ocean with one species, M. reticulata, found in the Desventuradas Islands and Juan Fernández Islands in the southeastern Pacific.

References

Neosebastinae
Taxa named by Gilbert Percy Whitley